The Pere Marquette 1223 is a steam locomotive on permanent display in Grand Haven, Michigan.  She is one of two surviving Pere Marquette 2-8-4 "Berkshire" type locomotives, along with sister engine No. 1225, the inspiration for the locomotive in the book and movie versions of The Polar Express, which is in operating condition.

History
Built in 1941 by the Lima Locomotive Works for $90,000 ($ in  dollars), 1223 hauled freight between Toledo and Chicago in the years immediately before and after World War II. When Pere Marquette was absorbed by the Chesapeake and Ohio Railway, the engine assigned number 2657 but never had the new number applied.  The locomotive was not paid off at the time and the merger agreement stated that equipment still under trust was to remain in Pere Marquette livery. It was retired from service in 1951.

After retirement, the engine was moved to New Buffalo, Michigan, to be scrapped. However, it was repainted and moved in 1960 for display at the state fairgrounds in Detroit. The money for that was provided by the donations collected by school children around the Detroit Area. In 1980, Michigan state fair officials wanted to expand the grandstands but the locomotive stood in the way. The city of Grand Haven won the bidding process. With the help of the Michigan National Guard as well as Grand Trunk Western and Chessie System railroads, it was moved to Grand Haven in 1981.

In 1982, the West Michigan Railroad Historical Society acquired the PM steel boxcar #72222 and cosmetically restored it and joined the engine on static display. Considering the number of years that it has stood out in the elements, it would be an expensive and time-consuming project to restore it to operation. However, It received a full cosmetic restoration in 1989. That same year, the PM caboose #986 was also purchased and would join the engine on static display.

The locomotive was added to the National Register of Historic Places on December 7, 2000.

On February 28, 2020, the engine and the rest of the display was vandalized, with the locomotive being spray-painted several times and a caboose door kicked in.

References

1223
2-8-4 locomotives
Lima locomotives
Individual locomotives of the United States
National Register of Historic Places in Michigan
Buildings and structures in Ottawa County, Michigan
Railway locomotives on the National Register of Historic Places
National Register of Historic Places in Ottawa County, Michigan
Railway locomotives introduced in 1941
Standard gauge locomotives of the United States
1′D2′ h2 locomotives
Grand Haven, Michigan
Preserved steam locomotives of Michigan